WIFI may refer to:

 Wi-Fi, a wireless networking technology
 WIFI (AM), a radio station (1460 AM) licensed to Florence, New Jersey, United States

Broadcast call sign disambiguation pages